Doloessa is a genus of snout moths (family Pyralidae). It was described by Philipp Christoph Zeller in 1848 and is known from India, Australia, New Guinea, Japan, Sri Lanka, Indonesia, and China.

Description
Veins 8 and 9 given off at intervals from vein 7. Male with a fascia of black scales on the ventral side of the forewings in and beyond the cell, and a similar subcostal fascia on the dorsal side of the hindwings.

Species
 Doloessa constellata Hampson, 1898
 Doloessa hilaropis (Meyrick, 1897
 Doloessa ochrociliella (Ragonot, 1893)
 Doloessa viridis Zeller, 1848

References

Tirathabini
Pyralidae genera